Gideon Fisher (b. August 1965) is an Israeli Lawyer and public figure. He is the founder of the Fisher Foundation for Holocaust Survivors. He also is head of The Israeli National Parents Association (INPA), Chairman of the Israeli International Arbitration Committee of the International Chamber of Commerce and was head of the Women's International Zionist Organization (Wizo) fundraising organization until 2012. Fisher is a lawyer and heads a law firm that carries his name.

Biography
Fisher was born on August 11, 1965. He is the son of Joseph and Malli Fisher who were Holocaust survivors. His father grew up in Austria and Israel and was a member of the Palmach. Fisher has four siblings: Esti;  David Fisher, who is a film director and producer; Ronel; and Amnon, a musician and an actor.

Public activities
Gideon Fisher is involved in a variety of public activities:
 Member of the International Chamber of Commerce (ICC) arbitration court management, Paris 
 Chairman of the Israeli International Arbitration Committee of the International Chamber of Commerce
 Judge in the ethics committee of the Israeli Press Association
 Head of The Israeli National Parents Association (INPA)
 Arbitrator on behalf of the Israel Bar Association
 Head of the Wizo fundraising organization between from 2009 to 2012
 Member of the committee of consultants appointment in Israeli Governmental companies from 2006 to 2012
 Member of the Committee for appointing lawyers to government companies
 Legal advisor to the tender board of Israeli Governmental Companies
 Head of the Minister of Treasury's committee related to Taxation privileges to the Israeli film industry from 2000 to 2010
 Member of the Judges Committee responsible for selecting the Government bodies to be awarded the Prime Minister's "Quality Seal" – CFO forum from 2003 to 2013

Fisher Foundation
The Fisher Foundation, founded by Fisher, provides scholarships and funds activities related to welfare and education. The foundation memorializes the Holocaust and helps the second generation of survivors, working to create recognition of the emotional toll they have suffered as a result of the Holocaust.

References

External links
The Fisher Fund website
Official Website of The International Chamber of Commerce (ICC) Israel 
Gideon Fisher & Co. website
The Israeli National Parents Association (INPA) web page on the Israeli Ministry of Education website

1956 births
Living people
Israeli lawyers